Senator Arnold may refer to:

A. Otis Arnold (1878–1941), Illinois State Senate
Alexander A. Arnold (1833–1915), Wisconsin State Senate
Frank B. Arnold (1839–1890), New York State Senate
Gohen C. Arnold, West Virginia State Senate
Jim Arnold (politician) (born 1950), Indiana State Senate
John W. Arnold (1842–1900), Illinois State Senate
Louis A. Arnold (1872–?), Wisconsin State Senate
Norbert P. Arnold (1920–2014), Minnesota State Senate
Samuel G. Arnold (1821–1880), U.S. Senator from Rhode Island
Stanley Arnold (1903–1984), California State Senate